Another Gay Movie is a 2006 American romantic comedy film directed by Todd Stephens. It follows four gay friends, Andy, Jarod, Nico and Griff, who vow upon graduating high school that they will all lose their "anal virginity" before their friend's Labor Day party. The film takes content from the 1999 teen comedy American Pie. A sequel, Another Gay Sequel: Gays Gone Wild!, was released in 2008.

Plot
The story centers around four gay friends who have recently graduated from San Torum High School. Andy (Michael Carbonaro) is an awkward, sex-crazed character who frequently masturbates with his mother's fruits and vegetables. Jarod (Jonathan Chase) is a handsome and fit jock who is quite insecure. Griff (Mitch Morris) is a nerdy, well-dressed guy who is secretly in love with Jarod. Nico (Jonah Blechman) is the most flamboyant, outgoing, and effeminate of the group. The four of them decide to make a pact to have sex by the end of the summer. Each boy proceeds to pursue sex in different ways, with both tragic and comedic results. Nico tries to secure an online date with a man named Ryder (Matthew Rush), but ends up with the grandfather (George Marcy) of their lesbian friend Muffler. Jarod seeks out fellow jocks, including a baseball pitcher named Beau (James Getzlaff), while Griff tries to earn the affection of Angel (Darryl Stephens), a male stripper; Jarod and Griff leave these men to have sex with each other instead, because they are in love. Andy, having failed to seduce his long-time crush, his math teacher, Mr. Puckov (Graham Norton), has a threesome with the rejected Beau and Angel. Much of the humor comes from how awkward each boy is at romance and how naive they are about sex. Each plot backfires horribly, until the boys finally begin to change their attitudes towards sex at the end of the film.

Cast
 Michael Carbonaro as Andy Wilson
 Jonah Blechman as Nico Hunter
 Jonathan Chase as Jarod
 Mitch Morris as Griff
 Ashlie Atkinson as Dawn Muffler
 Scott Thompson as Mr. Wilson
 Graham Norton as Mr. Puckov
 Stephanie McVay as Bonnie Hunter
 Lypsinka as Mrs. Wilson
 James Getzlaff as Beau
 Darryl Stephens as Angel
 Richard Hatch as himself
 George Marcy as Grandpa Muffler
 Megan Saraceni as Mini-Muff
 Saudia Mills as Muffler Acquaintance
 Andersen Gabrych as Tyler
 Angela Oh as Tiki
 Joanna Leeds as Daisy
 Mink Stole (deleted scenes) as Sloppi Seconds

Production 
Todd Stephens' previous work revolved around gay teens, like Edge of Seventeen and Gypsy 83. The film was a result of Stephens difficulty in securing distribution of Gypsy 83 because the film was not "gay" enough. Stephens said "I was really angry when I wrote it. Very frustrated. And Another Gay Movie'''s what came out." Actor Jonah Blechman initially refused the script, but became intrigued by his own shock to Stephens' script that he decided to join the project as the executive producer.

Release and reception
On April 29, 2006, the film had its premier at Lowes Village East in New York. The film grossed $745,327 at the box office on a $500,000 budget.

Tirdad Derakhshani of The Philadelphia Inquirer described the film as "an unapologetic, un-P.C., in-your-face gay take on American Pie." Kyle Buchanan of The Advocate reflected the positive impact of the film as a "...parody that felt necessary. Arriving during the heyday of Project Runway and The Ellen DeGeneres Show, the film came as both confirmation of gay people's mainstream status and a built-in corrective to it." The film was not reviewed favorably by Ann Hornaday of The Washington Post, who described the film as a painful derivative of the gross-out teen comedy. Ed Blank said the campy vulgarity of the film caters to a niche audience, but the film "delivers an abominable ensemble performance in an unplayable script".

 Soundtrack
 Another Gay Sunshine Day – Nancy Sinatra
 I Know What Boys Like – Amanda Lepore
 Everything Makes Me Think About Sex – Barcelona
 Clap (See the Stars) – The Myrmidons
 Vamos a la Playa – United State of Electronica
 Dirty Boy – IQU
 Hot Stuff – The Specimen
 Fuego – Naty Botero
 All Over Your Face – Cazwell
 Pleasure Boy – Seelenluft
 This is Love – Self
 Peterbilt Angel – Morel
 Another Ray of Sunshine – Nancy Sinatra
 Let the Music Play – Shannon
 I Was Born This Way'' – Craig C. featuring Jimmy Somerville

References

External links
 
 
 
 
 

2006 films
2006 independent films
2006 LGBT-related films
2006 romantic comedy films
2000s American films
2000s coming-of-age comedy films
2000s English-language films
2000s high school films
2000s parody films
2000s teen sex comedy films
2000s teen romance films
American coming-of-age comedy films
American high school films
American independent films
American parody films
American romantic comedy films
American sex comedy films
American teen comedy films
American teen LGBT-related films
American teen romance films
Coming-of-age romance films
Gay-related films
Lesbian-related films
LGBT-related coming-of-age films
LGBT-related romantic comedy films
LGBT-related sex comedy films
Films about virginity
Films shot in Los Angeles
Films shot in New Jersey